Mark Southon is a New Zealand celebrity chef and television personality. He was previously the resident chef for the New Zealand morning TV Show The Cafe, which aired from 2016 until 2020 

In 2023, Southon is due to appear in the New Zealand 2023 television series, Clubhouse Rescue.

References 

Living people
New Zealand chefs
New Zealand television personalities
Year of birth missing (living people)